An Amateur Laborer is an autobiographical book by Theodore Dreiser.

Overview
Although started in 1904, it was only published posthumously in 1983.

The book is an autobiographical account of a three-year struggle with neurasthenia in the aftermath of Sister Carrie 's financial failure. After being constantly turned down for publications while living in Brooklyn, Dreiser finds a job as a manual worker on a railroad. Eventually, his brother Paul Dresser sends him to a health resort, leading to his replenished morale.

References

1983 non-fiction books
Books about depression
Books by Theodore Dreiser
Books published posthumously
University of Pennsylvania Press books
American autobiographies